Harriet Campbell-Taylor House is a historic home located at Westfield in Chautauqua County, New York. It is a two-story brick Italianate and Greek Revival style dwelling built in 1850.

It was listed on the National Register of Historic Places in 1983.

References

Houses on the National Register of Historic Places in New York (state)
Italianate architecture in New York (state)
Greek Revival houses in New York (state)
Houses completed in 1850
Houses in Chautauqua County, New York
National Register of Historic Places in Chautauqua County, New York